Western Skies is Roddy Frame's third solo album and was released on 1 May 2006.

Track listing
All tracks composed by Roddy Frame; except where indicated
"Western Skies" (Frame, Dan Carey, Robert Gorham)
"The Coast"
"Marble Arch"
"She Wolf"
"Tell the Truth"
"Rock God"
"Day of Reckoning"
"Shore Song" 
"Dry Land"
"Worlds in Worlds"	 
"Portastudio"

Personnel
Roddy Frame - vocals, guitar; bass on "Days of Reckoning" and "Worlds in Worlds"
Mark Neary - double bass
Jeremy Stacey - drums, percussion, marxophone, melodica, celesta
Mark Smith - bass on "Portastudio"

2006 albums
Roddy Frame albums